Jason William Zent (born April 15, 1971) is an American former professional ice hockey player. He played parts of three seasons in the NHL for the Ottawa Senators and Philadelphia Flyers.

Career statistics

Awards and honors

References

External links
 

1971 births
American men's ice hockey left wingers
Detroit Vipers players
Ice hockey people from Buffalo, New York
Living people
New York Islanders draft picks
Ottawa Senators players
Philadelphia Flyers players
Philadelphia Phantoms players
Prince Edward Island Senators players
Wisconsin Badgers men's ice hockey players
Worcester IceCats players